Daniel Fleming may refer to:

Sir Daniel Fleming, 5th Baronet (–1821), of the Fleming baronets
Daniel Fleming (antiquary) (1633–1701), English antiquary
Daniel Fleming (rugby league) (born 1992), Welsh international
Daniel E. Fleming (born 1957), American biblical scholar and Assyriologist